Singapore participated at the 2018 Summer Youth Olympics in Buenos Aires, Argentina from 6 October to 18 October 2018.

Athletics

Singapore qualified one athlete based on the Youth Olympic Games Asia Area Qualifiers.

 Boys' High Jump - Kampton KAM
Individual

Badminton

Singapore qualified two players based on the Badminton Junior World Rankings. 

Singles

Team

Fencing

Gymnastics

Artistic
Singapore qualified one gymnast based on its performance at the 2018 Asian Junior Championship.

 Girls' artistic individual all-around - 1 quota

Multidiscipline

Sailing

Singapore qualified one boat based on its performance at the Asian Nacra 15 Qualifiers. Later, at the 2018 Singapore Open (Asian Techno 293+ Qualifiers) Singapore qualified two boats.

 Boys' Techno 293+ - 1 boat
 Girls' Techno 293+ - 1 boat
 Mixed Nacra 15 - 1 boat

Shooting

Singapore qualified one sport shooter based on its performance at the 2017 Asian Championships.

 Girls' 10m Air Pistol - Amanda MAK

Individual

Team

Sport climbing

Swimming

Boys

Girls

Mixed

Table tennis

Singapore qualified one table tennis player based on its performance at the Road to Buenos Aires (Latin America) series. Singapore later qualified a male table tennis player based on its performance at the Road to Buenos Aires (Oceania) series.

 Boys' singles - Pang Yew En Koen
 Girls' singles - Goi Rui Xuan

Triathlon

Singapore qualified one athlete based on its performance at the 2018 Asian Youth Olympic Games Qualifier.

Individual

Relay

References

External links
NOC Schedule

2018 in Singaporean sport
Nations at the 2018 Summer Youth Olympics
Singapore at the Youth Olympics